Rolling is a type of motion that combines rotation and translation.

Rolling may also refer to:

Arts, entertainment and media
 Rolling (film), a 2007 drama
 Rolling (video game), an inline skating video game
 "Rolling", a song by Soul Coughing from the 1998 album El Oso

Places

 Rolling, Bous, Luxembourg
 Rolling, Wisconsin, U.S.
 Rolling Bay, Bainbridge Island, Washington, U.S.

Other uses
 Rolling (finance), trading contracts to maintain a given maturity
 Rolling (metalworking), a fabricating process
 Rolling (physiology), an aspect of leukocyte extravasation 
 Rolling (television), a problem with analog TV sets
 Rolling, or sparring, in Brazilian jiu-jitsu
 Rolling, decorating trees and houses with paper, also called Toilet papering
 Danny Rolling (1954–2006), an American serial killer and rapist

See also
 
 Roll (disambiguation)
 Roller (disambiguation)
 Rollin (disambiguation)
 Rowling (disambiguation)